Asperula arcadiensis, the Arcadian woodruff,  is a species of flowering plant in the coffee family Rubiaceae, native to the Peloponnese Mountains of Greece.

Description
It is often confused with A. suberosa which it resembles. It grows in sun or partial shade, in any reasonably moist, well-drained soil, but prefers coastal areas and other mild locations where temperatures do not fall below , or alternatively the protection of an alpine house.

This plant has gained the Royal Horticultural Society’s Award of Garden Merit.

Growth cycle
Asperula ambleia flowers around May-June, and grows best in a rock garden, trough or crevice.

References

arcadiensis
Flora of Greece